Arundel Blackfriars, otherwise Dominican Priory, Arundel, was a friary of the Dominican Order in Arundel, West Sussex, England. The date of foundation was before 1253, when Saint Richard, bishop of Chichester, mentioned it in his will. The friary remained small and poor throughout its history. It was dissolved in 1538.

There are structural remains of the friary's south range in Mill Lane, which were previously misidentified as the Maison Dieu.

References

Monasteries in West Sussex
Dominican monasteries in England